Mullah Nooruddin Turabi (ملا نورالدین ترابي; born 1959) is an Afghan Taliban senior leader and current Deputy President of the Afghan Red Crescent Society. Turabi served as Minister of Justice from 1996 to 2001 in the Taliban's previous government.

References

Living people
Taliban leaders
Taliban government ministers of Afghanistan
Afghan judges
Sharia judges
Place of birth missing (living people)
1959 births